Miles Glacier is a -long glacier in the U.S. state of Alaska. It was named in 1885 after U.S. Army Maj. Gen. Nelson A. Miles by a Lt. Allen during his Alaska expedition.

References

Glaciers of Alaska
Glaciers of Chugach Census Area, Alaska
Glaciers of Unorganized Borough, Alaska